Pararrhaptica leucostichas is a moth of the family Tortricidae. It was first described by Edward Meyrick in 1932. It is endemic to the Hawaiian island of Oahu.

The larvae feed on Myrsine species. They feed on the shoots of their host plant.

External links

Archipini
Endemic moths of Hawaii